Namatahi Waa (born 24 September 1990) is a New Zealand rugby union player, who currently plays as a prop for  in New Zealand's National Provincial Championship competition and Austin Gilgronis in the Major League Rugby (MLR).

Early career

Waa hails from Pīpīwai in the Northland Region in New Zealand.  For his final years of high school (2008-2010) he attended Te Aute College in Hawke's Bay; while there, he played for the college's First XV.  He also played for the Hawke's Bay under-18 and under-19 representative teams.

After finishing secondary school, Waa returned home to Northland, but later moved to Auckland where he was named in the Auckland Juniors (U21) squad in 2012  and Auckland B squad in 2013.

In February 2014, he was - for the first time - named in the  Development squad.

Senior career

In 2014, Waa turned down a contract with Auckland and instead signed with the Northland Rugby Union for the 2014 ITM Cup season. In that and the following three seasons, he played a total of 29 games for the Taniwha.

On 28 October 2015, Waa was named in the  wider training group ahead of the 2016 Super Rugby season. He played two more games for the Blues.

In 2019, Waa returned to Hawke's Bay and played for Taradale Rugby and Sports in the province's club rugby competition, hoping to make the Magpies squad.  On 5 August 2019, he was named in the  squad for the 2019 Mitre 10 Cup season.  He made his Magpies debut against  on 11 August 2019.

International

In 2016, Waa - who is of Ngāpuhi descent - was called into the Māori All Blacks squad for their Northern tour to Chicago, Limerick and London as an injury replacement for Mike Kainga, but didn't get named in the teams to play the United States, Munster and Harlequins.

References

External links
itsrugby.co.uk profile

1990 births
Living people
Ngāpuhi people
People educated at Te Aute College
New Zealand rugby union players
New Zealand Māori rugby union players
Rugby union players from the Northland Region
Rugby union props
Blues (Super Rugby) players
Northland rugby union players
Hawke's Bay rugby union players
Māori All Blacks players
Austin Gilgronis players